Tain railway station is an unstaffed railway station serving the area of Tain in the Highland council area of Scotland. ScotRail, who manage the station, operate all services.

History 

In its heyday the station had a staff of approximately thirty people. The station was opened on 1 June 1864 by the Highland Railway. Murdoch Paterson was the engineer involved in the construction of the station (1863–1864).

There have been two engine sheds at Tain in the past: the first was timber-built and originally from Invergordon, which included a turntable. It was re-erected and reopened in June 1864, but burned down on 20 April 1877. The second was stone-built and opened in 1877. There were no facilities at the shed, although there was a water column and a turntable at the station. It was closed on 18 June 1962, and later demolished. Both the turntable and the water tank were demolished at a later date, although the pit wall tops of the turntable remain visible. Two signal boxes have also been at the station, one at the north end and one at the south end, although both of these are now demolished.

Facilities 
Both platforms have benches, although only platform 1 has a shelter. There is step-free access to both platforms (from two car parks, 1 adjacent to each platform), although the platforms are connected via a footbridge. The only help point is on platform 2. As there are no facilities to purchase tickets, passengers must buy one in advance, or from the guard on the train.

Platform layout 
Platform 1 on the southbound line can accommodate trains having seven coaches, whereas platform 2 on the down northbound line can hold eight.

Passenger volume 

The statistics cover twelve month periods that start in April.

Services

There are five through trains northbound (four to Wick & Thurso, one to Ardgay) in the December 2021 timetable, and eight trains to Inverness southbound on weekdays & Saturdays. The additional departures to Inverness run mainly in the morning peak & evening and are run primarily for commuters. On Sundays there are four trains to Inverness and a single departure to Wick.

References

Bibliography

External links

photo of disused turntable pit before being filled in

Railway stations in Highland (council area)
Railway stations served by ScotRail
Railway stations in Great Britain opened in 1864
Former Highland Railway stations
1864 establishments in Scotland
Listed railway stations in Scotland
Category B listed buildings in Highland (council area)
Tain